In computer science, a three-way comparison takes two values A and B belonging to a type with a total order and determines whether A < B, A = B, or A > B in a single operation, in accordance with the mathematical law of trichotomy.

Machine-level computation 
Many processors have instruction sets that support such an operation on primitive types.
Some machines have signed integers based on a sign-and-magnitude or one's complement representation (see signed number representations), both of which allow a differentiated positive and negative zero. This does not violate trichotomy as long as a consistent total order is adopted: either −0 = +0 or −0 < +0 is valid. Common floating point types, however, have an exception to trichotomy: there is a special value "NaN" (Not a Number) such that x < NaN, x > NaN, and x = NaN are all false for all floating-point values x (including NaN itself).

High-level languages

Capabilities 
In C, the functions strcmp and memcmp perform a three-way comparison between strings and memory buffers, respectively. They return a negative number when the first argument is lexicographically smaller than the second, zero when the arguments are equal, and a positive number otherwise. This convention of returning the "sign of the difference" is extended to arbitrary comparison functions by the standard sorting function qsort, which takes a comparison function as an argument and requires it to abide by it. 

In C++, the C++20 revision adds the "spaceship operator" <=>, which similarly returns the sign of the difference and can also return different types (convertible to signed integers) depending on the strictness of the comparison.

In Perl (for numeric comparisons only, the cmp operator is used for string lexical comparisons), PHP (since version 7), Ruby, and Apache Groovy, the "spaceship operator" <=> returns the values −1, 0, or 1 depending on whether A < B, A = B, or A > B, respectively. The Python 2.x cmp(removed in 3.x), OCaml compare, and Kotlin compareTo functions compute the same thing. In the Haskell standard library, the three-way comparison function compare is defined for all types in the Ord class; it returns type Ordering, whose values are LT (less than), EQ (equal), and GT (greater than):

data Ordering = LT | EQ | GT 

Many object-oriented languages have a three-way comparison method, which performs a three-way comparison between the object and another given object. For example, in Java, any class that implements the Comparable interface has a compareTo method which either returns a negative integer, zero, or a positive integer, or throws a NullPointerException (if one or both objects are null). Similarly, in the .NET Framework, any class that implements the IComparable interface has such a CompareTo method.

Since Java version 1.5, the same can be computed using the Math.signum static method if the difference can be known without computational problems such as arithmetic overflow mentioned below. Many computer languages allow the definition of functions so a compare(A,B) could be devised appropriately, but the question is whether or not its internal definition can employ some sort of three-way syntax or else must fall back on repeated tests.

When implementing a three-way comparison where a three-way comparison operator or method is not already available, it is common to combine two comparisons, such as A = B and A < B, or A < B and A > B. In principle, a compiler might deduce that these two expressions could be replaced by only one comparison followed by multiple tests of the result, but mention of this optimisation is not to be found in texts on the subject.

In some cases, three-way comparison can be simulated by subtracting A and B and examining the sign of the result, exploiting special instructions for examining the sign of a number. However, this requires the type of A and B to have a well-defined difference. Fixed-width signed integers may overflow when they are subtracted, floating-point numbers have the value NaN with undefined sign, and character strings have no difference function corresponding to their total order. At the machine level, overflow is typically tracked and can be used to determine order after subtraction, but this information is not usually available to higher-level languages.

In one case of a three-way conditional provided by the programming language, Fortran's now-deprecated three-way arithmetic IF statement considers the sign of an arithmetic expression and offers three labels to jump to according to the sign of the result:

     IF (expression) negative,zero,positive

The common library function strcmp in C and related languages is a three-way lexicographic comparison of strings; however, these languages lack a general three-way comparison of other data types.

Spaceship operator
The three-way comparison operator for numbers is denoted as <=> in Perl, Ruby, Apache Groovy, PHP, Eclipse Ceylon, and C++, and is called the spaceship operator. 

The name's origin is due to it reminding Randal L. Schwartz of the spaceship in an HP BASIC Star Trek game. Another coder has suggested that it was so named because it looked similar to Darth Vader's TIE fighter in the Star Wars saga.

Example in PHP:
echo 1 <=> 1; // 0
echo 1 <=> 2; // -1
echo 2 <=> 1; // 1

Composite data types

Three-way comparisons have the property of being easy to compose and build lexicographic comparisons of non-primitive data types, unlike two-way comparisons.

Here is a composition example in Perl.
sub compare($$) {
    my ($a, $b) = @_;
    return $a->{unit} cmp $b->{unit}
        || $a->{rank} <=> $b->{rank}
        || $a->{name} cmp $b->{name};
}
Note that cmp, in Perl, is for strings, since <=> is for numbers. Two-way equivalents tend to be less compact but not necessarily less legible. The above takes advantage of short-circuit evaluation of the || operator, and the fact that 0 is considered false in Perl. As a result, if the first comparison is equal (thus evaluates to 0), it will "fall through" to the second comparison, and so on, until it finds one that is non-zero, or until it reaches the end.

In some languages, including Python, Ruby, Haskell, etc., comparison of lists is done lexicographically, which means that it is possible to build a chain of comparisons like the above example by putting the values into lists in the order desired; for example, in Ruby:
[a.unit, a.rank, a.name] <=> [b.unit, b.rank, b.name]

See also
 strcmp

References 

Conditional constructs
Operators (programming)